Cristian Crusat Schretzmeijer (born 1983, Marbella) is a Spanish-Dutch writer. His father was Spanish and his mother Dutch. He studied literature at the Complutense University of Madrid and applied linguistics at the International University Menéndez Pelayo of Santander and the Cervantes Institute. He completed his doctorate in comparative literature at the University of Amsterdam.

His books include: 
 Estatuas (Pre-Textos, 2006) 
 Tranquilos en tiempo de guerra (Pre-Textos, 2010) 
 Breve teoría del viaje y el desierto (Pre-Textos, 2011).

He has translated the writings of Marcel Schwob. He won the EU Prize for Literature for Breve teoría del viaje y el desierto.

References

1983 births
Living people
Spanish novelists
Spanish male novelists
Spanish translators
21st-century Dutch novelists
University of Amsterdam alumni
People from Marbella
Dutch male novelists
21st-century Dutch male writers
21st-century translators